CFB Edmonton (also called 3rd Canadian Division Support Base Edmonton) is a Canadian Forces base located in Sturgeon County adjacent to the City of Edmonton in Alberta, Canada. It is also known as Edmonton Garrison or "Steele Barracks".

History
The history of CFB Edmonton begins at an airfield called Blatchford Field, a few kilometres south from where CFB Edmonton would eventually be established. The airfield was established in 1927 as a private and commercial interest by bush pilots, with support from the Mayor of Edmonton, airfield namesake Kenny Blatchford, opening a few months after he ended his term as mayor with his election as a Member of Parliament representing the city. The airfield became important to the opening up and development of the Canadian north, while also cementing Edmonton's place as the "Gateway to the North".

During the Second World War, Blatchford Field became a Royal Canadian Air Force (RCAF) training station under the British Commonwealth Air Training Plan. No. 16 Elementary Flying Training School (No. 16 EFTS) and No. 2 Air Observers School (No. 2 AOS) used the aerodrome. The RCAF also ran No. 4 Initial Training School (No. 4 ITS) which was a ground school located at the University of Alberta. No. 16 EFTS closed in 1942 and No. 2 AOS closed in 1944. After No. 2 AOS closed, the station formally became known as RCAF Station Edmonton. Many RCAF squadrons and units were located here, including a survival school and the RCAF Winter Experimental Establishment (WEE). A United States Army Air Forces (USAAF) B-29 bomber detachment also used the station.

During the war, the airfield was a major factor in supporting the Allies of World War II, becoming a staging point for the U.S. defence of Alaska, as well as a major waypoint of the Northwest Staging Route supplying equipment and aircraft to the Soviet military. Aircraft had to be ferried and transport aircraft used the aerodrome to support the construction of the Alaska Highway. Air traffic increased significantly and flying activities were becoming hazardous. The Americans ran the Namao airfield until the end of the war when the Canadian Government took it over. With time, RCAF Station Edmonton also developed severe limitations at Blatchford, and on 1 October 1955 all RCAF Squadrons and support units were transferred to the "new" RCAF Station Namao. Blatchford Field was turned over to the Edmonton municipal government and became the commercial Edmonton City Centre (Blatchford Field) Airport.

During the Cold War, RCAF Station Namao was used by the United States Strategic Air Command, which constructed a "Nose Dock" capable of servicing the nose and wings of heavy jet bombers and tankers on the south side of the airfield. The station also hosted the Edmonton Rescue Coordination Centre, and served as home base for United Nations Food Aid flights, delivering aid to Ethiopia, Somalia, and Bosnia. Because Namao at that time had a  runway, 12/30, it was designated an emergency Space Shuttle landing site by NASA.

In 1968, when Canada's armed force branches were amalgamated, RCAF Station Namao was redesignated Canadian Forces Base Edmonton (Lancaster Park) and was under command of the new Air Transport Command and later Air Command.

Federal Government budget cuts forced the command of the air station to be transferred to the Canadian Forces Land Force Command in 1994. CFB Edmonton (Lancaster Park)/18 Wing Edmonton was redesignated CFB Edmonton.

Although both runways are still visible they are no longer in use except for a  section of 03/21 used by helicopters.

In 2010–2011, Government of Canada announced the construction of new facilities for visiting Canadian Armed Forces members training at CFB Edmonton (3rd Canadian Division Support Base Edmonton (3 CDSB)).

Units
These units are headquartered at CFB Edmonton:
 3rd Canadian Division
 1 Canadian Mechanized Brigade Group
 1 Canadian Mechanized Brigade Group Headquarters and Signal Squadron
 Lord Strathcona's Horse (Royal Canadians)
 1 Combat Engineer Regiment
 1st Battalion, Princess Patricia's Canadian Light Infantry
 3rd Battalion, Princess Patricia's Canadian Light Infantry
 1 Service Battalion
 3rd Canadian Division Support Group
 D Company, 3rd Canadian Division Training Centre
 6 Intelligence Company
 1 Military Police Regiment
1 Field Ambulance
1 Dental Unit Detachment Edmonton
408 Tactical Helicopter Squadron

Today
The principal function of the CFB Edmonton today is to field a general purpose combat-effective mechanized brigade group, or any portion thereof, ready for deployment to a minimal-intensity battlefield in accordance with assigned tasks.

CFB Edmonton is the headquarters of 3rd Canadian Division, the highest army authority in western Canada, and 1 Canadian Mechanized Brigade Group (1 CMBG), the only Regular Force brigade group in the region. The base is situated at Steele Barracks (named for Sir Sam Steele) just north of the city. The area formerly known as CFB Griesbach within the city itself is no longer operational. All buildings and land having been sold and are no longer Crown assets. The final closure was announced by Minister MacKay in 2012. The base as a collective is an important part of the community surrounding Edmonton and is home to some of the most prestigious and experienced units in the Canadian Military.

The 3rd Battalion, Princess Patricia's Canadian Light Infantry, along with elements of Lord Strathcona's Horse (Royal Canadians) and 1 Combat Engineer Regiment (all part of 1 CMBG) were chosen to be a part of Canada's military response to the September 11, 2001 attacks and were deployed on combat operations to Afghanistan (including Operation Anaconda) in 2001 and 2002. Units from the base were deployed to Kandahar, Afghanistan, as part of the Canadian Forces command takeover in that area as well. Units from Edmonton were also deployed on domestic operations such as to assist with the Red River Flood in 1997 (where the entire 1 CMBG was deployed) and, more recently, as a part of Operation Peregrine in response to the forest fires in British Columbia in 2003. Units from CFB Edmonton were also deployed on numerous peacekeeping operations, including to Bosnia and Kosovo, among others.

At the end of March 2010 there were 4,237 regular military, 905 reserve Class A, B, and C forces, and 665 civilian workers at CFB Edmonton. CFB Edmonton has around one-third of the Canadian army's fighting power.

In February 2012, it was reported that the Alberta Government had been in contact with the federal government and military officials in Ottawa and Edmonton over the use of the runway for MEDIVAC flights with the planned closure of Edmonton City Centre Airport. Alberta Deputy Premier Doug Horner said that he had spoken with the Minister of National Defence, Peter MacKay, and the Minister of Public Works, Rona Ambrose for further discussion. It was ultimately decided to operate all medical flights out of a purpose-built facility at the Edmonton International Airport.

On June 7, 2013, the base hosted the raising of a rainbow flag to kick off Edmonton Pride, the first time that the flag was flown on a Canadian military base.

CFB Edmonton also participated in Operation Unifier in Ukraine, 2015–2016.

In August 2016 CFB Edmonton troops joined the NATO mission in Poland, Operation Reassurance.<

References

External links

CFB Edmonton
CFB Edmonton - National Defence and the Canadian Armed Forces

Canadian Forces bases in Alberta
Military airbases in Alberta
Heliports in Canada
Cfb Edmonton
Cfb Edmonton
Cfb Edmonton
Airfields of the United States Army Air Forces Air Transport Command in Alaska
1955 establishments in Alberta
Airports established in 1955
Military airbases established in 1955